Woodburn, also known as Woodbourne, is a historic plantation house located near Charles City, Charles City County, Virginia. The house was built about 1815 by John Tyler, who later served as tenth President of the United States.  The Palladian house is a three-part frame structure consisting of a tall, two-story, three-bay central section with a gable-end facade and flanking chimneys, and two, low one-story, one-bay wings.  Also on the property are a contributing one-story frame office (c. 1830) and an original smokehouse.  The Woodburn property was purchased by John Tyler in 1813.  He resided there until 1821, and sold the property to his brother Wat H. Tyler in 1831.  During his residence at Woodburn, he served as Congressman.

It was added to the National Register of Historic Places in 1978.

References 

Plantation houses in Virginia
Presidential homes in the United States
John Tyler
Houses on the National Register of Historic Places in Virginia
Houses completed in 1815
Houses in Charles City County, Virginia
National Register of Historic Places in Charles City County, Virginia
Tyler family residences